Chinnambavi is a mandal and village in Wanaparthy district, Telangana, India.

Villages 
The villages in Chinnambavi mandal include:

 Dagada
 Peddamarur 
 Chinnamarur
 Vellatur 
 Chellepahad 
 Ayyavaripalle 
 Kalloor 
 Koppunur 
 Lakshmipalle
 Solipuram
 Ammaipalle
 Dagadapalle
 Velgonda
 Miyapuram
 Bekkam
 Gaddabaswapuram

References 

Wanaparthy district
Mandals in Wanaparthy district
Census towns in Wanaparthy district